Gilda O'Neill (25 May 1951 – 24 September 2010) was a British novelist and historian, particularly of the local history of the East End of London.

Partial list of publications
 My East End: Memories of Life in Cockney London (2000) 
 East End Tales (Quick Reads) (2008) 
 Our Street: East End Life in the Second World War (2004)  (paperback)

Novels
 The Cockney Girl (1992)
 Whitechapel Girl (1993)
 The Bells of Bow (1994)
 Just Around the Corner (1995)
 Cissie Flowers (1996)
 Dream On (1997)
 The Lights of London (1998)
 Playing Around (2000)
 Getting There (2001)
 The Belts and Bow (2001)
 The Sins of Their Fathers (2002)
 Make Us Traitors (2003)
 Of Woman Born (2005)

Personal life

O'Neill was born in Bethnal Green.

She died from side-effects triggered by medication prescribed for a minor injury.

Her son Jeremy died in Thailand in 2013. He was 37 and drowned in the sea.

Notes

External links
 Author's page at Penguin Books
 Author's page at fantasticfiction.co.uk
  Author's page at Random House

1951 births
2010 deaths
English historians
20th-century English novelists